The Kalinin K-15 was a planned rocket fighter designed by Konstantin Kalinin in the early 1930s. The armament most likely would have been two 20mm ShVAK cannons in the wing roots. The aircraft never left the design stage due to Kalinin's arrest.

The aircraft was a tailless delta-wing configuration, similar to modern delta-wings.

See also 
 List of rocket aircraft

References 

1930s Soviet fighter aircraft
Kalinin aircraft
Rocket-powered aircraft